Winter & Winter is a record label in Munich, Germany that specializes in jazz, classical and improvised music. It was founded by Stefan Winter following the demise of his JMT Records label.

Since 1997 Winter & Winter has released records by Dave Douglas, Paul Motian, Jim Black,  Fred Frith and Uri Caine and rereleased albums from the JMT catalogue, including recordings by Steve Coleman, Cassandra Wilson, Greg Osby, Django Bates, and Paul Motian.

Discography

References

See also 
 List of record labels

German independent record labels
Jazz record labels
Mass media in Munich
IFPI members
Record labels established in 1995
1995 establishments in Germany